Igor Novaković (born 24 May 1979) is a Croatian retired football midfielder.

Club career
He had a short spell with Austrian third tier side Elin Weiz.

Honours
Rijeka
Croatian Cup: 2005, 2006

References

External links
 
 Interview: Igor Novaković
  Igor Novaković

1979 births
Living people
Sportspeople from Karlovac
Association football wingers
Croatian footballers
NK Karlovac players
NK Hrvatski Dragovoljac players
NK Croatia Sesvete players
NK Zagreb players
HNK Rijeka players
FC Tom Tomsk players
Al-Arabi SC (Qatar) players
FC Koper players
SC Weiz players
Croatian Football League players
Russian Premier League players
Qatar Stars League players
Slovenian PrvaLiga players
Austrian Regionalliga players
Croatian expatriate footballers
Expatriate footballers in Russia
Croatian expatriate sportspeople in Russia
Expatriate footballers in Qatar
Croatian expatriate sportspeople in Qatar
Expatriate footballers in Slovenia
Croatian expatriate sportspeople in Slovenia
Expatriate footballers in Austria
Croatian expatriate sportspeople in Austria